Zimmer 483 ("Room 483") is the second studio album by the German rock band Tokio Hotel. It was released in Germany on 23 February 2007. The album yielded four singles including "Übers Ende der Welt", "Spring nicht" and "An deiner Seite (Ich bin da)". In contrast to other Tokio Hotel releases Zimmer 483 has proven to be the most reliable when it comes to sales, with over 375,000 copies sold in just two months. It has been certified platinum in Austria. The album was initially released in a Digipak case with a bonus DVD including the promotional video for "Übers Ende der Welt", special Making-Of the video feature, Interview, and Photo gallery.

Track listing
Credits adapted from the liner notes of Zimmer 483.

The Romanian version of Zimmer 483 features the track listed visible on its tracklist. However, on this version "In Die Nacht" is listed as the first track and the other tracks are listed and playing in the normal order as the general version, starting with the second track.

Deluxe Edition – Bonus DVD
 Photo Gallery "Zimmer 483"
 Interview
 "Übers Ende der Welt" (Making of)
 "Übers Ende der Welt" (Music Video)

Release history

Charts

Year-end

Certifications

Personnel

Performance credits
 Bill Kaulitz – lead vocals, additional keyboard
 Tom Kaulitz – guitars, piano, backing vocals
 Georg Listing – bass guitar, keyboards, synthesizers, backing vocals
 Gustav Schäfer – drums, percussion

Technical credits
 Production: Patrick Benzner, Dave Roth, Peter Hoffmann, David Jost
 Mixing: Patrick Benzner, Dave Roth, Manfred Faust
 Mastering: Gateway Mastering
 Photography: Jens Boldt

References

External links
 

2007 albums
German-language albums
Tokio Hotel albums